Asalebria venustella is a species of snout moth in the genus Asalebria. It was described by Ragonot, in 1887, and is the type species of its genus. 
It is found in Portugal, Spain, France, Sardinia, Russia, Kazakhstan and Mongolia.

References

Moths described in 1887
Phycitini
Moths of Europe
Moths of Asia